The Wondrous World of Sonny & Chér is the second studio album by American pop duo Sonny & Cher, released in 1966 by Atco Records.

Album information 
It was released in 1966 and reached #34 on the Billboard album charts.

The song "But You're Mine" was the first single released from the album, and it peaked at #15 in US and #17 in UK, becoming a big hit. The next single did slightly better, it was a cover of "What Now My Love" and it reached #14 in US and #13 in UK, becoming the only version of that song to reach the top twenty on both sides of the Atlantic.

The album is largely a collection of cover songs including "Summer Time" (originally by George Gershwin) and "Set Me Free" (originally by The Kinks). In 1999 the album was re-released and contained three bonus tracks, "The Revolution Kind", "Have I Stayed Too Long" and "Crying Time".

Track listing 
Side A
"Summertime" (Ira Gershwin, George Gershwin, Dubose Heyward) – 2:35
"Tell Him" (Bert Russell) – 2:34
"I'm Leaving It All Up to You" (Don Harris, Dewey Terry) – 2:18
"But You're Mine" (Sonny Bono) – 3:02
"Bring It On Home to Me" (Sam Cooke) – 3:04
"Set Me Free" (Ray Davies) – 2:20

Side B
"What Now My Love" (Carl Sigman, Gilbert Bécaud, Pierre Delanoë) – 3:28
"Leave Me Be" (Chris White) – 2:03
"I Look for You" (Sonny Bono) – 2:40
"Laugh at Me" (Sonny Bono) – 2:50
"Turn Around" (Harry Belafonte, Alan Greene, Malvina Reynolds) – 2:47
"So Fine" (Johnny Otis) – 2:30

Charts

Personnel 
Cher – vocals
Sonny Bono – vocals
Wrecking Crew – instrumental backing

Production 
Harold Battiste – conductor
Sonny Bono – arrangements, producer
Bob Irwin – mastering, mixing
Stan Ross – engineer

Design 
Rich Russell – package design
Jerry Schatzberg – cover photography
Haig Adishian – original cover artwork
Jud Cost – liner notes

References 

1966 albums
Sonny & Cher albums
Atco Records albums
Atlantic Records albums
Albums conducted by Harold Battiste
Albums arranged by Sonny Bono
Albums produced by Sonny Bono
Albums recorded at Gold Star Studios